The Adenauer Bach is a right-hand, southern tributary of the Ahr, just under 16 kilometres long. It flows through Adenau in the county of Ahrweiler in the German state of Rhineland-Palatinate.

Geography

Course 
In its upper reaches the Adenauer Bach is known as the Breidscheider Bach and it rises about a kilometre south of Quiddelbach at an elevation of ca. . It flows in a northeasterly direction to Breidscheid on the Nordschleife of the Nürburgring motor racing track. From there it bears the name of Adenauer Bach. 
It then flows in a westerly direction, mostly in pipes, through the town of Adenau and then heads north, passing the villages of Leimbach and Niederadenau (part of Dümpelfeld). In Dümpelfeld it discharges from the right into the Rhine tributary, the Ahr at about 209 m.

Catchment and tributaries 
The catchment area is 58.5 km² and drains via the Ahr and Rhine into the North Sea.

Among the tributaries of the Adenauer Bach are the following (in downstream order):

Remarks

References

External links 
 AW Wiki – Adenauer Bach
 Überschwemmungsgebiet Adenauer Bach

Rivers of Rhineland-Palatinate
Rivers of the Eifel
Ahrweiler (district)
Rivers of Germany